Yasmin Botelho Fernandez (born June 6, 1988), best known as Yasmin Brunet, is a Brazilian model and actress who appeared in the 2008 Sports Illustrated Swimsuit Issue.

Biography 
Brunet was born in the neighborhood of Gávea, in the city of Rio de Janeiro, Brazil. Her father, Armando Fernandez, is an Argentine businessman and her mother, Luíza Brunet, is a Brazilian model. She owns a home in Ipanema.

Filmography

Television

Personal life

In July 2012, after about 7 years of dating, she married Brazilian model Evandro Soldati. They divorced in early 2020.

Brunet is an advocate for animal rights and is also committed to raising awareness about environmentalism, banned substances and humanitarian causes. In May 2016, she revealed to be vegetarian for more than 7 years.

References

External links
 Yasmin Brunet at the Fashion Model Directory
 
 One Thousand Models
 Yasmin Brunet at the 2008 Sports Illustrated Swimsuit Issue

1988 births
Living people
Brazilian female models
Brazilian television actresses
Actresses from Rio de Janeiro (city)
Brazilian people of Argentine descent
People from Rio de Janeiro (city)
21st-century Brazilian women